Jeff Stelling (born 18 March 1955) is an English television presenter. He currently presents Gillette Soccer Saturday for Sky Sports and hosted coverage of the Champions League between 2011 and 2015. 

He also presented the Channel 4 quiz show Countdown (2009–2011) and ITV game show Alphabetical (2016–2017).

On 30 October 2021, Stelling announced his intention to leave Soccer Saturday at the end of the 2021–22 season. However, on 28 March 2022, Sky Sports announced that Stelling would be staying until at least the end of the 2022–23 season.

Early life 
Stelling was brought up in a council house in Hartlepool.  He attended Rift House Primary School and West Hartlepool Grammar School. After leaving school his first job was as a journalist at the Hartlepool Mail where he remained for four years.

Career 
His first broadcasting position was as a reporter on Middlesbrough F.C. on Radio Tees in the late 1970s. He was a sports presenter on London's LBC Radio Sportswatch programme in the early 1980s before moving to BBC Radio 2's weekend sports programme Sport on 2, covering the Los Angeles and Seoul Olympic games.

He later spent time as a sports newsreader at TV-am, Channel 4, Eurosport and British Satellite Broadcasting before moving to Sky in 1992 to present coverage of horse racing, greyhound racing, snooker and darts. In 2003, he won a sports presenter special edition of The Weakest Link. In 2004, Stelling was offered but rejected an offer from the BBC to front Score—their new Saturday results service. The job was given to Ray Stubbs.

In May 2013, Stelling joined twentyfour7 Football Magazine and wrote columns for the magazine's Dream Team. He has also been featured in the in-game presentation work for EA Sports' FIFA 14 and FIFA 15.

Sports Saturday 
In 1994, Stelling became presenter of Sports Saturday, which became Gillette Soccer Saturday in 1998, hosting a programme lasting up to six hours of football discussion and live reports on the afternoon's games with a panel of pundits including Frank McLintock, Chris Kamara, Rodney Marsh and George Best. Much of the programme's popularity is put down to Stelling, with The Guardian praising him for "exceptional professionalism and élan". In October 2021, he announced that he would be leaving the show at the end of the football season. However, in March 2022, it was announced Stelling would be staying until at least the end of the 2022–23 season.

At the start of the 2005–06 Premiership football season, Stelling replaced Ian Payne as the host of Sky Sports' Monday Night Football programme. However, Stelling's appointment coincided with a new, shorter format of the programme, with Stelling presenting the show live from the ground of that evening's game. Previously, the show had been presented from a studio, and had featured some coverage of the prior weekend's games. Moreover, in previous years on Monday nights without a live game, a Monday Night Football Special would be broadcast, which included only the analysis from the weekend's games. This appears to have been dropped from the 2005–06 season, indicating that Stelling's appointment is to a smaller role than that held by his predecessors.

In 2011, Stelling replaced the departed Richard Keys as the main presenter of Sky's live Champions League coverage and hosted between 2011 and 2015.

Game shows
On 21 November 2008, it was reported that Stelling had been confirmed as the new host of the Channel 4 game show Countdown following the departure of Des O'Connor. He had reportedly also been approached for the role following the death of long-time host Richard Whiteley, but the role was given to former fellow sports presenter Des Lynam instead. Stelling began recording Countdown in December 2008, with the show's new assistant Rachel Riley, and started broadcasting in January 2009. However, it was announced on 25 May 2011 that Stelling would be stepping down as presenter of Countdown at the end of the year, after three years at the helm, to concentrate on football, including his new Champions League role. He was replaced by Nick Hewer.

In August 2016, Stelling presented a new 10-part daytime game show for ITV called Alphabetical. The show returned for a second series of 20 episodes in October 2017.

TV series cameos
Stelling appears as himself in a number of episodes of the football comedy TV series Ted Lasso. He has also appeared as himself in The IT Crowd, Dream Team and Mike Bassett: Manager. He appeared in an advert for Sky Broadband in 2013 which spoofed a previous Sky Broadband advert which starred Bruce Willis.

Recognition 
On 23 November 2007 he was awarded an honorary Doctor of Professional Studies by the University of Teesside.

Stelling was named Sports Broadcaster of the Year for four successive years by the Sports Journalists' Association, based on a poll of its members.

On 12 March 2010, he was granted the title of honorary freeman of his home town of Hartlepool, along with the town's former MP Lord Mandelson.

Personal life 
Stelling lives in Bishop's Waltham in south Hampshire with his wife Liz and two sons Robbie (born August 1998) and Matthew (born November 1999) and a daughter Olivia (born June 2003). They were married in November 1998 in Richmond upon Thames. He has completed the London Marathon on eight occasions and his best time is 3 hours and 28 minutes. In June 2013, Stelling, Colin Cooper, Craig Hignett and 12 others climbed Mount Kilimanjaro raising money for the children's charity The Finlay Cooper Fund. The climb raised £100,000.

In 2015, Stelling was appointed president of Hartlepool United after accepting a request from the club's owners.

In 2016, Stelling walked 262 miles from Hartlepool United to Wembley Stadium over 10 days raising over £420,000 for Prostate Cancer UK. He walked with his friend Russ Green, who was the Chief Executive of Hartlepool United at the time, and was joined by over 400 walkers including his friends from Sky Sports and the football world such as Chris Kamara, Matt Le Tissier, Charlie Nicholas and Paul Merson. On Day 3, Sir Ian Botham arrived to lend his support and walked with Stelling to Glanford Park, the home of Scunthorpe United, one of Botham's former clubs from his football career.

In 2017, Stelling again pledged to walk to raise money for Prostate Cancer UK. In June that year he covered the length of 15 marathons in as many days, starting from St. James Park in Exeter, home of Exeter City and ending at St. James' Park in Newcastle, home of Newcastle United.

In his book, "I've Got Mail" published on 17 September 2020, Stelling revealed he had been subject to a blackmail attempt via two letters sent to his home. The letters demanded a £50,000 payment in return for bogus accusations of sex assaults to be kept quiet. In a radio interview on BBC Radio 5 Live on 2 December 2020, Stelling recounted sharing the letters with his wife and together, through a family friend's contact at Scotland Yard, they learnt others had also been targeted by the same scammers.

References

External links 
 
 University of Teesside
 Hartlepool Mail June 2008
 Interviewed by Ron Aitken, Independent on Sunday
 Guardian interview

1955 births
Living people
Darts people
English association football commentators
English game show hosts
English television presenters
Hartlepool United F.C. non-playing staff
People from Bishop's Waltham
People from Hartlepool
Sky Sports presenters and reporters